The Abbott's duiker (Cephalophus spadix), also known as minde in Swahili, is a large, forest-dwelling duiker (small antelope) found only in a few scattered enclaves in Tanzania. It may be a subspecies of the yellow-backed duiker. It is very rare, and the first photograph of an Abbott's duiker in the wild was taken as recently as 2003.

Characteristics
This duiker has a glossy, dark brown coat which is lighter on the underside. The face is paler and gray in color, with a large red tuft on the forehead; the horns are thin and short. The secretive behavior of Abbott's duiker, along with its largely nocturnal habits and preference for dense vegetation, means little is known about the ecology and behavior of this species. It has been observed feeding on leaves in the forest understory, and on vegetation in forest clearings, and may feed on fruits, flowers and moss. An Abbott's duiker has also been seen with a frog in its mouth; duikers are known to occasionally capture and feed on live prey.
The cryptic habits and alertness of Abbott's duiker unfortunately does not protect it entirely from predation. Young Abbott's duikers are probably preyed on by African crowned eagles (Stephanoetus coronatus) and pythons (Python species), while duikers of all ages may fall victim to leopards (Panthera pardus). Lions (Panthera leo) and spotted hyenas (Crocuta crocuta) may also hunt this duiker species in some areas

Habitat
Abbott's duiker is endemic to Tanzania, in the Eastern Arc Mountains, Mount Kilimanjaro, and Southern Highlands in scattered populations. They live mainly in wet forests and swamps between 1,700 and 2,700 m above sea level, but can sometimes wander to much higher altitudes at 4,000 m. They eat mainly fruit and possibly other plant matter. Abbott's duikers are nocturnal, spending the days at rest in thickets. They form regular pathways through the undergrowth, making them relatively easy to find. If threatened, they generally try to run, though they have been known to kill pursuing dogs when left with no escape route.

Status
Less than 1,500 Abbott's duiker are estimated to be left in the world, with no captive population. They are threatened by habitat destruction and hunting.

References

External links 
 Abbott's duiker at ARKive
 Abbott's duiker at ultimateungulate

Abbott's duiker
Mammals of Tanzania
Endemic fauna of Tanzania
Abbott's duiker